Grammatikov , feminine:  Grammatikova is a Russian surname. Notable people with the surname include:

Vladimir Grammatikov, Russian and Soviet theater and film actor, director, screenwriter and producer
Alexander Grammatikov, an associate of Sidney Reilly

See also
Gramatikov, Bulgarian variant
Grammaticus

Russian-language surnames

ru:Грамматиков